On December 12, 2007, all seven members of the Federal Council, the government of Switzerland, were elected by the joint chambers of the Federal Assembly for the 2008–2012 term of office. Councillors are elected individually by an absolute majority of votes, with the incumbent councillors defending their seats in descending order of seniority.

All seven incumbents were running for re-election. All were re-elected, with the exception of Christoph Blocher, the councillor from the Swiss People's Party (SVP). The Federal Assembly elected Eveline Widmer-Schlumpf in Blocher's place, who accepted her election on the following morning. Pascal Couchepin was elected President of the Swiss Confederation for 2008, and Hans-Rudolf Merz, instead of Blocher, was elected Vice President of the Federal Council for 2008.

As a result of the non-election of their official candidate Christoph Blocher, the People's Party declared itself an opposition party and excluded its nominal representatives on the Federal Council, Samuel Schmid and Eveline Widmer-Schlumpf, from its parliamentary group.

Background

In the 2007 Swiss federal elections, the SVP expanded their share of votes again, mostly at the expense of the Social Democrats (SPS). Christoph Blocher, the de facto leader of the SVP, had become embroiled in a political scandal over the circumstances of the resignation of federal chief prosecutor Valentin Roschacher in 2006.  However, a parliamentary oversight commission controlled by his political opponents failed to implicate him in any substantial wrongdoing. Under these circumstances, it was generally assumed that any attempt by the center-left parties in Parliament to unseat him must fail, even though Blocher had made many personal opponents with his confrontational political style.

Nonetheless, according to a reconstruction of events by the Neue Zürcher Zeitung, the Social Democrats began to plan Blocher's removal from office immediately after the elections, but obtained no clear commitment from the centrist Christian Democrats (CVP). To provoke these parties into action, the Green Party of Switzerland nominated Luc Recordon as their own candidate to run against Blocher The GPS had previously tried to obtain a seat in 1987 and 1991, when they nominated Leni Robert against the SVP's Adolf Ogi, and in 2000, when they nominated Cécile Bühlmann for Ogi's seat when he retired.

Four days before the election, the Social Democrats contacted Eveline Widmer-Schlumpf to inform her that she would probably receive a substantial number of votes. Widmer-Schlumpf reportedly did not state whether she would accept or decline her possible election. At the same time, the Christian Democratic party chief, Christophe Darbellay, publicly indicated his opposition to Blocher and hinted that he would accept if elected in his stead. On the eve of the elections, the leaders of the Social Democrats, the Greens and the Christian Democrats secretly agreed to support Widmer-Schlumpf, after a test ballot in the Christian Democratic parliamentary group indicated that a majority of the group did not support Blocher. During the night, the Greens withdrew Recordon's candidacy and the center-left party leaders sought out support among individual representatives of the Free Democrats (FDP). All the while, Widmer-Schlumpf's name was kept secret to prevent her party from exerting pressure on her and to prevent her from appearing as a candidate of the Left. Only immediately before the elections were most center-left members of parliament asked by their leadership to support Widmer-Schlumpf.

Candidates 

The following candidates participated in the election:

 Incumbents, in descending order of seniority:
 Moritz Leuenberger (SPS), head of the Federal Department of Environment, Transport, Energy and Communications,
 Pascal Couchepin (FDP), head of the Federal Department of Home Affairs,
 Samuel Schmid (SVP), head of the Federal Department of Defence, Civil Protection and Sports,
 Micheline Calmy-Rey (SPS), head of the Federal Department of Foreign Affairs,
 Christoph Blocher (SVP), head of the Federal Department of Justice and Police,
 Hans-Rudolf Merz (FDP), head of the Federal Department of Finance,
 Doris Leuthard (CVP), head of the Federal Department of Economic Affairs.
 Other candidates:
 Eveline Widmer-Schlumpf (SVP), a member of the government of the canton of Graubünden. She was proposed by center-left parties as an alternative candidate for the seat of Christoph Blocher, although it remains uncertain whether or not this happened with her consent.

Results 

Source showing only the final votes in favor of each winner:

Seat held by Moritz Leuenberger 
Moritz Leuenberger was re-elected during the first ballot. His re-election was supported by all parliamentary groups except that of the SVP.

Seat held by Pascal Couchepin 
Pascal Couchepin was re-elected during the first ballot. His re-election was supported by all parliamentary groups.

Seat held by Samuel Schmid 

Samuel Schmid was re-elected during the first ballot. His re-election was supported by all parliamentary groups.

Seat held by Micheline Calmy-Rey 

Micheline Calmy-Rey was re-elected during the first ballot. Her re-election was supported by all parliamentary groups except that of the SVP.

Seat held by Christoph Blocher 

Christoph Blocher's seat was the only contested seat, and this contest was the focus of the public attention directed at the elections. His re-election was officially supported only by the SVP and FDP parliamentary groups. The SVP threatened to withdraw from the government in the case of Blocher not being re-elected.

Prior to the election, the Green group proposed a candidate of their own, State councillor Luc Recordon, to contest Blocher's seat. Recordon's candidacy was withdrawn after left and centrist parties proposed to elect Eveline Widmer-Schlumpf, a centrist SVP executive councillor from the canton of Graubünden, in Blocher's stead.

Widmer-Schlumpf was elected with 125 votes in the second round. A SVP motion of order to interrupt the election until afternoon was rejected with 155 votes against. Widmer-Schlumpf  declared on 13 December, 8 a.m., that she would accept her election.

Seat held by Hans-Rudolf Merz 

Hans-Rudolf Merz was re-elected during the first ballot. His re-election was supported by all parliamentary groups.

Seat held by Doris Leuthard 

Doris Leuthard was re-elected during the first ballot. Her re-election was supported by all parliamentary groups except that of the SVP.

Federal Chancellor 

Annemarie Huber-Hotz, the chancellor between 2000 and 2007, did not seek re-election. Three candidates were presented by the parties: Corina Casanova (CVP/PDC), vice-chancellor between 2000 and 2007, Nathalie Falcone-Goumaz (SVP/UDC) and Markus Seiler (FDP/PRD). Corina Casanova was elected in the first round of voting.

See also 
 List of members of the Swiss Federal Council
 2007 Swiss federal election

References

External links
 Election website of the Swiss Federal Assembly

Federal Council
2007